Shel is a masculine given name, usually a short form of Sheldon. People named Shel include:

 Shel Bachrach (born 1944), American insurance broker, investor, businessman and philanthropist
 Shel Dorf (1933–2009), American comic book enthusiast and founder of the convention San Diego Comic-Con International
 Shel Silverstein (1930–1999), American writer known for his cartoons, songs and children's books
 Shel Talmy (born 1937), American record producer, songwriter and arranger
 Shel Trapp (1935–2010), American community organizer

English-language masculine given names
Hypocorisms